Puka (Quechua for red, Hispanicized spelling Puca) is a  mountain in the Andes of Peru. It is situated in the Huancavelica Region, Huancavelica Province, Acobambilla District, and in the Junín Region, Huancayo Province, Chongos Alto District. Puka lies southwest of Warmi Mach'ay, between the lakes named Warmiqucha in the southeast and Quylluqucha in the north.

References

Mountains of Huancavelica Region
Mountains of Junín Region
Mountains of Peru